Yevgeni Vasilyevich Kobzar (born 9 August 1992) is a Russian professional footballer who plays as a forward for Shakhter Karagandy.

Club career
Kobzar made his debut in the Russian Football National League for FC Khimki on 7 August 2012 in a game against FC Sibir Novosibirsk.

Armenia
On 7 June 2021, FC Urartu announced that Kobzar had left the club after his contract expired. After leaving Urartu, Kobzar signed for Noravank on 8 February 2022.

Kazakhstan
On 7 July 2022, Shakhter Karagandy announced the signing of Kobzar.

References

External links
 
 

1992 births
Sportspeople from Stavropol
Living people
Russian footballers
PFC CSKA Moscow players
FC Khimki players
FC Sakhalin Yuzhno-Sakhalinsk players
FCI Levadia Tallinn players
FK Spartaks Jūrmala players
FC Urartu players
Russian First League players
Meistriliiga players
Esiliiga players
Latvian Higher League players
Armenian Premier League players
Russian expatriate footballers
Expatriate footballers in Estonia
Expatriate footballers in Latvia
Expatriate footballers in Armenia
Association football forwards
FC Lokomotiv Moscow players
FC Zenit-Izhevsk players
Russian expatriate sportspeople in Armenia
Russian expatriate sportspeople in Estonia
Russian expatriate sportspeople in Latvia
Russian expatriate sportspeople in Kazakhstan
Expatriate footballers in Kazakhstan